Vrnjačka Banja is a town and municipality located in the Raška District of central Serbia. The population of the town is 10,065 inhabitants, while the population of the municipality is 27,527 inhabitants.

Vrnjačka Banja has many hot springs with temperatures measuring exactly that of the human body (37.5 degrees Celsius).

Settlements
Aside from the town of Vrnjačka Banja, the municipality includes the following settlements:

 Vraneši
 Vrnjci
 Vukušica
 Goč
 Gračac
 Lipova
 Novo Selo
 Otorci
 Podunavci
 Rsavci
 Ruđinci
 Stanišinci
 Štulac

Demographics

According to the last official census done in 2011, the municipality of Vrnjačka Banja has 27,527 inhabitants. Population density on the territory of the municipality is 115.2 inhabitants per square kilometer.

Ethnic groups
Most of its population are ethnic Serbs (96.2%) and 36.6% of the municipality’s population is urban. The ethnic composition of the municipality:

Economy
The following table gives a preview of total number of registered people employed in legal entities per their core activity (as of 2018):

Tourism
Situated in a great park full of trees with particularly charming houses, Vrnjačka Banja is the most celebrated and most popular spa town of Serbia and at same time, a very attractive recreation center. Surrounding Vrnjačka Banja are UNESCO protected medieval buildings. Other nearby landmarks include the first court of the Serbian Archbishop, the Žiča Monastery and Sopoćani Monastery which both date back to the thirteenth century and the twelfth century Studenica Monastery all of which are located in Ibar River Valley.

It owes its reputation to its therapeutic effects known already to the Roman troops in the second century AD. It was upgraded by the Czech Baron Herder in 1835 after Prince Miloš Obrenović wanted it to be like Karlovy Vary, it has since received people from all of southern Europe, who came to rest or for treatment. Summers are pleasant, and the winter is mild. Natural springs can be found on five mineral water sources well positioned in the park. The warm water (36 degrees Celsius) is ideal for massage and cool (17 degrees Celsius) sufficiently reviving. 

There are seven mineral springs +1 Legend in Vrnjačka Banja, from which first four are used for medical treatment:
 Topla voda (36.5°C)
 Snežnik (17°C)
 Slatina (24°C)
 Jezero  (27°C)
 Beli izvor
 Borjak
 Vrnjačko vrelo

The hotels are numerous and have swimming pools and halls for games. In winter, it is convenient for skiing on the Goč, just a few kilometres away. In the summer, Vrnjačka Banja is transformed into one of greatest cultural centres in Serbia: literary soirées in a city library, classical concerts under the column capitals and the festival of the cinema scenario. The restaurants are often on the border of a water current and offer terraces under the trees of the park.

The largest Opanak in the world, in the Guinness World Records since 2006, is the 3.2m shoe, size 450, weighing , made by opančar Slavko Strugarević, from Vrnjačka Banja, Serbia.

A number of modernistic buildings inspired by Art-Nouveau by architect Mihajlo Mitrović can be found in Vrnjačka Banja.

Bridge of Love
One of the famous landmarks of Vrnjačka Banja is the Bridge of Love.

Gallery

See also
 List of spa towns in Serbia
 Trstenik Airport

References

External links

 

Populated places in Raška District
Tourism in Serbia
Municipalities and cities of Šumadija and Western Serbia
Spa towns in Serbia